Low Energy Dance Music is the debut studio album by the indie rock band Elephant Micah. It was released in 2002 on Landmark Records.

Track listing
~ ~ ~ ~ ~ ~ ~ ~
"You Take My Sense With Longing"
"Loud Guitars"
"Breakdance in 3/4"
"Late Radio"
"Put to Bed"
 * * * * * * * *
"Story of a Hospitalized Heart"
"Like This:"
"Artificial Lights' Flickering"
"Piece for Organ and Baritone"
"Halloween Sunday"
"Dance Sensation"
"Rides Away"
"Low Energy Beat"

References

Elephant Micah albums
2002 debut albums